Brenthia quadriforella is a species of moth of the family Choreutidae. It was described from New Britain, but is also present in Australia (the Northern Territory and eastern Queensland) and Fiji.

References

External links
Image at CSIRO Entomology

Brenthia
Moths of Australia
Moths described in 1877